Anacleto se divorcia is a 1950 Mexican film. It stars Carlos Orellana. 
A factory's guard has problems with his wife because of a co-worker's lies.

References

Cast
Carlos Orellana		
Rosa Arenas		
Rita Montaner		
Andrés Soler		
Rogelio A. González		
Miguel Arenas		
Jorge Casanova		
Bertha Lehar		
Carlota Solares		
Lidia Franco		
Antonio R. Frausto		
Bobby Capó

External links
 

1950 films
1950s Spanish-language films
Films based on works by Pedro Muñoz Seca
Mexican black-and-white films
1950s Mexican films